Meier General Store, also known as Butler Bros. Grocer Co., is a historic general store located at New Melle, St. Charles County, Missouri.  It was built about 1857, and is a one-story, gable front frame building.  It sits on a stone foundation and is sheathed in weatherboard.

It was listed on the National Register of Historic Places in 2002.

References

Commercial buildings on the National Register of Historic Places in Missouri
Commercial buildings completed in 1857
Buildings and structures in St. Charles County, Missouri
National Register of Historic Places in St. Charles County, Missouri
General stores in the United States